Enteroctopus megalocyathus, also known as Patagonian red octopus (EN), Pulpo del sur (Chile) and Pulpo colorado (Argentina); is a medium-sized octopus, and the type species for the genus Enteroctopus.

Size and description
E. megalocyathus is a relatively large octopus, though not as large as some other giant octopuses like Enteroctopus dofleini. E. megalocyathus has an average mass of around 4 kg. Although, some individuals have outweighed this and reached till 7.5 kg (M) and 8 kg (F). A mantle length of 22.5 cm, and in excess of 1 m in total length, but other author reported a max. total length in Chile of 1.3 m. E. megalocyathus, like other octopuses in the genus Enteroctopus, has longitudinal folds and grooves on the body and large, paddle-like papillae.

Fisheries
E. megalocyathus is one of the two commercially significant octopuses in Chilean waters, along with Octopus mimus. Yearly catch of the two octopuses fluctuates between 2,000 and 5,000 tons.

In Chile, his extraction ban date is from October 15 to March 15, and its range is from the Araucanía region to the Magallanes region, and in regular season, only specimens weighing more than 1 kg are allowed to be extracted.

Predators
Like most octopuses, E.  megalocyathus is a choice meal for many predators larger than it. E. megalocyathus has been shown to be a major dietary component of beaked skates (Dipturus chilensis), spiny dogfish (Squalus acanthias), and the South American sea lion (Otaria flavescens).

Range

This octopus is native to the southeastern coast of South America along the coasts of Argentina (Atlantic Ocean) and Chile (Pacific Ocean). In Chile ranges from north Patagonia, Chiloé Archipelago to Strait of Magellan and even more at 56°S, and in Argentina from the San Matías Gulf to the Beagle Channel, including the Falkland Islands and the Burdwood bank.

Its vertical range distribution in the water column is from 0 m depth (e.g. juvenile in intertidal rocky shore) to 220 m depth (e.g. seen in bottom crab traps) in Chile.

Feeding ecology 
In general it is an opportunistic predator and eats crabs, teleost fishes, some molluscs e.g. clams, mussels, sea snails among other prey. In Southern Chile, specifically in Los Lagos region, the adults octopuses prefer to eat big crabs like jaiba reina, jaiba peluda and even other E. megalocyathus as they are cannibal, as well as other species; meanwhile the younger octopuses prefer to eat jaiba mora, crab eggs, shrimp and squat lobster or langostino de los canales.

Aquaculture status 
This species has high protein content and low-fat percentage. It also possesses a fast growth rate and easy weighing  in rearing conditions; thereby making it an ideal species to culture.

References

External links

 Images of E. megalocyathus, many of which show the longitudinal folds of the body and paddle-like papillae that characterize this genus.

Octopuses
Cephalopods of South America
Molluscs of Chile
Molluscs of Argentina
Molluscs of the Atlantic Ocean
Molluscs of the Pacific Ocean
Cephalopods described in 1852